The electoral district of Queenton was a Legislative Assembly electorate in the state of Queensland, Australia.

History
Queenton was created in the 1910 redistribution, taking effect at the 1912 state election, and existed until the 1932 state election. It was based on the eastern part of Charters Towers and surrounding rural area.

When Queenton was abolished in 1932, its area was incorporated into the district of Charters Towers.

Members

The following people were elected in the seat of Queenton:

References

Former electoral districts of Queensland
1912 establishments in Australia
1932 disestablishments in Australia
Constituencies established in 1912
Constituencies disestablished in 1932